

The Tellier T.3  was a French two-seat patrol biplane flying-boat designed and built by Société Alphonse Tellier et Cie à Neuilly (Tellier) and also produced by Société Anonyme des Établissements Nieuport (Nieuport).

Design and development
Based on the earlier Tellier T.2 the T.3 was a two-bay, unequal-span biplane flying boat powered by a  Hispano-Suiza 8Ac engine in pusher configuration, with the pilot sitting ahead of the engine and the gunner/observer in the nose with a forward-facing Vickers machine gun.

Following test flights by both the Aviation Militaire and the Aéronavale, the Aéronavale ordered ten aircraft and the British Royal Naval Air Service (RNAS) ordered two for gun and camouflage trials at the Isle of Grain. A total of 100 aircraft were built, including 47 by Nieuport, who took over the assets of Tellier.

A development of the T.3 was armed with a cannon in the nose and was designated the Tellier T.c.6. Large orders were placed, but only 55 had been built by the Armistice.

Production of two-seat Tellier T.3s was also carried out in Russia, but no aircraft were assembled. Ten Tellier T.3s were assembled from the wartime parts, in the nascent Soviet Union, at GAZ No.3 (GAZ - Gosudarstvenny Aviatsionnyy Zavod'' – state aviation plant/factory).

Variants
T.3 Production aircraft built by Tellier and Nieport; Approx 190 T.3s were built, including ten in Russia / Soviet Union.

T.6 (also known as Tc.6, denoting cannon armament) At least 55 T.3s with lengthened rear fuselage armed with  Hotchkiss cannon.

Operators

French Naval Aviation

Royal Naval Air Service

Specifications (T.3)

References

Bibliography

1910s French military reconnaissance aircraft
Tellier aircraft
Flying boats
Single-engined pusher aircraft
Biplanes
Aircraft first flown in 1917